Metiapine is a typical antipsychotic medication of the dibenzothiazepine group. There is scarce research on the safety and efficacy of metiapine in humans, though limited human trials exist.

Medical uses
Metiapine has been investigated for the treatment of schizophrenia.

Side effects
Like other typical antipsychotics, it has a high rate of extrapyramidal side effects.

Pharmacology
Metiapine has strong antidopaminergic effects and is classified as a typical (i.e., first-generation) antipsychotic.

Chemistry
Metiapine is a dibenzothiazepine derivative. Like clothiapine, metiapine has a sulfur atom replacing the nitrogen atom found in dibenzapine derivative antipsychotics like clozapine.

Synthesis
Metiapine can be synthesized through the following mechanism:

History
Metiapine was first discovered in the 1970s by Marion Merrell Dow (now a part of Sanofi).

Research
A 2017 Cochrane Review provided guidance for a double-blind, randomized controlled trial of metiapine versus chlorpromazine for the treatment of schizophrenia, though the authors acknowledged that it is unlikely that any future trials will investigate the use of metiapine in humans. The available evidence for the use of metiapine is very limited.

References 

Abandoned drugs
Dibenzothiazepines
Dopamine antagonists
Piperazines
Typical antipsychotics